Samn Stockwell is an American poet.

Life
She lives in Marshfield, Vermont. She has published poetry in Ploughshares, Prairie Schooner, Rhino, Seneca Review, and The New Yorker.

Awards
 1994 National Poetry Series, for Theater of Animals

Works
"To Utopia", AGNI
"Beholder", Ploughshares, Spring 2003 
"Exoskeleton"; "Five P.M."; "DMQ Review''

Anthologies

References

External links
"Paley remembered", Montpellier Times Argus, October 8, 2007

Year of birth missing (living people)
Living people
American women poets
21st-century American women